Fhrancis Oliver Lopez (born February 3, 1989), is a Filipino model, endorser and beauty pageant titleholder known for being the winner of the Mister Philippines 2011 pageant. She represented the Philippines at the Mister International 2011 pageant and finished in the Top 16.

Biography 
Lopez was born and raised in the southern tip of Metro Manila. Before he joined the pageant of Mister Philippines, Fhrancis worked as a model. Fhrancis and his agency signed a contract with the Go Green Artists and the Project Management. After he won and got the prize, Fhrancis held a pageant in Patravadi Theatre. Lopez is one of the Top 16 finalists in Mister International 2011.

Pageantry

Mister Philippines 2011 & Mister International 2011 
Lopez was declared as one of the winners of Mister Philippines 2011. After he won the competition on December 17, 2011, Lopez joined to compete in the Mister International 2011 pageant in Pattaya, Thailand and Bangkok.

See also 
 JM de Guzman
 Mister International 2011
 Mister Philippines 2011
 Neil Perez

References

External links
 Official Mister International website
 Official Misters of the Philippines website 

1989 births
Living people
Mister International
People from Las Piñas
Tagalog people
Filipino male models